René Pleven (15 April 1901 – 13 January 1993) was a notable French politician of the Fourth Republic. A member of the Free French, he helped found the Democratic and Socialist Union of the Resistance (UDSR), a political party that was meant to be a successor to the wartime Resistance movement. He served as prime minister twice in the early 1950s, where his most notable contribution was the introduction of the Pleven Plan, which called for a European Defence Community between France, Italy, West Germany, and the Benelux countries.

Early life

René Pleven was born in Rennes on 15 April 1901 as the son of a commissioned officer and director of studies at the Special Military School of St. Cyr. After studying law at the University of Paris, he failed the exam for the financial corps of the civil service, so he decided to move to the United States, Canada, and Great Britain to work there. He rose to the become a telephone company executive. In 1924, he married Anne Bompard.

Wartime

Immediately after the breakout of the Second World War, he was in charge of encouraging the construction of aircraft for the Allies in the United States and of purchasing planes for France. As late as 1939, Pleven stated that "Politics do not interest me," but then a year later, he joined Charles de Gaulle's Free French Forces, which resisted the Nazi-allied French Vichy Regime. Pleven suggested a political union between Britain and France, with a unification of sovereignty and defensive forces. The plan, supported by Winston Churchill, Paul Reynaud and Charles de Gaulle was not approved due to the opposition of the French armistice with Germany. Pleven helped rally support for Free France in French Equatorial Africa. Returning to London, where de Gaulle and his forces were exiled, in 1941, he became national commissioner for the economy, finance, the colonies and foreign affairs of the French National Committee. In this role, he presided over a 1944 conference in Brazzaville, which opted for a more liberal policy towards the colonies.

Postwar years

After France's liberation, he was the Minister of the Economy and Finance in the provisional government. After the war, Pleven was elected a legislator from the Côtes-du-Nord department. In 1946, he broke with Charles de Gaulle and founded the Democratic and Socialist Union of the Resistance (UDSR) serving as the party's president from 1946 to 1953. The party was positioned between the Radical Socialists and the Socialists, favoring limited industrial nationalization and state controls. He then held several Cabinet posts, most notably Defense Minister from 1949 to 1950. In July 1950 he became the country's Prime Minister, as power was shifting to the right. A vehement supporter of European integration, he pushed the ratification of the Schuman Plan for European integration creating the European Coal and Steel Community as Prime Minister. He had to face opposition from both left and right to push it through, but he collected enough votes in parliament by promising to increase farm loans and to lower taxes for low-income groups. After three days and two nights of debate, the treaty was ratified. He served until February 1951 and then again from August 1951 to January 1952, resigning over disagreements about budget deficits.

He then became Defense Minister again. His proposal for a European Defense Community, in which to integrate a re-armed Germany, known as the Pleven Plan, was defeated by the Gaullists, communists, and socialists. He also advocated a hard hand in defending French colonial rule in Indochina. In 1953, he resigned as chairman of the UDSR after his party supported the Vietnam peace talks. Being Minister of Defense from 1952 to 1954, he was responsible when the French lost the Battle of Dien Bien Phu initiating the crumbling of French hegemony in the whole region. In 1957, President René Coty offered him the opportunity to become Prime Minister again, but he turned it down. Instead, he became the Fourth Republic's last Foreign Minister in 1958.

In 1966, Pleven's wife died. He had had two daughters, Françoise and Nicole, with her. From 1969 to 1973, he served as Minister of Justice in the governments of Jacques Chaban-Delmas and Pierre Messmer, signing the pardon of notorious escapee Henri Charrière in 1970. Losing re-election as legislator in 1973, he became president of a regional development council in his native Brittany. He died of heart failure on 13 January 1993 at the age of 91.

Governments

First ministry (12 July 1950 – 10 March 1951)
René Pleven – President of the Council
Robert Schuman – Minister of Foreign Affairs
Guy Mollet – Minister for the Council of Europe
Jules Moch – Minister of National Defense
Henri Queuille – Minister of the Interior
Maurice Petsche – Minister of Finance and Economic Affairs
Edgar Faure – Minister of Budget
Jean-Marie Louvel – Minister of Commerce and Industry
Paul Bacon – Minister of Labour and Social Security
René Mayer – Minister of Justice
Gaston Defferre – Minister of Merchant Marine
Pierre-Olivier Lapie – Minister of National Education
Louis Jacquinot – Minister of Veterans and War Victims
Pierre Pflimlin – Minister of Agriculture
François Mitterrand – Minister of Overseas France
Antoine Pinay – Minister of Public Works, Transport, and Tourism
Pierre Schneiter – Minister of Public Health and Population
Eugène Claudius-Petit – Minister of Reconstruction and Town Planning
Charles Brune – Minister of Posts
Albert Gazier – Minister of Information
Jean Letourneau – Minister of Relations with Partner States
Paul Giacobbi – Minister without Portfolio

Second Ministry (11 August 1951 – 20 January 1952)
René Pleven – President of the Council
Georges Bidault – Vice President of the Council and Minister of National Defense
René Mayer – Vice President of the Council and Minister of Finance and Economic Affairs
Robert Schuman – Minister of Foreign Affairs
Charles Brune – Minister of the Interior
Pierre Courant – Minister of Budget
Jean-Marie Louvel – Minister of Industry
Paul Bacon – Minister of Labour and Social Security
Edgar Faure – Minister of Justice
André Morice – Minister of Merchant Marine
André Marie – Minister of National Education
Emmanuel Temple – Minister of Veterans and War Victims
Paul Antier – Minister of Agriculture
Louis Jacquinot – Minister of Overseas France
Antoine Pinay – Minister of Public Works, Transport, and Tourism
Paul Ribeyre – Minister of Public Health and Population
Eugène Claudius-Petit – Minister of Reconstruction and Town Planning
Joseph Laniel – Minister of Posts
Robert Buron – Minister of Information
Pierre Pflimlin – Minister of Commerce and External Economic Relations
Jean Letourneau – Minister of State
Maurice Petsche – Minister of State
Henri Queuille – Minister of State

Changes:
16 September 1951 – Minister of State Maurice Petsche dies.
4 October 1951 – Joseph Laniel becomes a Minister of State. Roger Duchet succeeds Laniel as Minister of Posts.
21 November 1951 – Camille Laurens succeeds Antier as Minister of Agriculture.

References

1901 births
1993 deaths
Prime Ministers of France
French Foreign Ministers
French Ministers of Justice
French Ministers of Overseas France
French Ministers of Finance
Members of the Constituent Assembly of France (1945)
Politicians from Rennes
Presidents of the Regional Council of Brittany
Members of the Regional Council of Brittany
Democratic and Socialist Union of the Resistance politicians
Centre Democracy and Progress politicians
Deputies of the 1st National Assembly of the French Fourth Republic
Deputies of the 2nd National Assembly of the French Fourth Republic
Deputies of the 3rd National Assembly of the French Fourth Republic
Deputies of the 1st National Assembly of the French Fifth Republic
Deputies of the 2nd National Assembly of the French Fifth Republic
Deputies of the 3rd National Assembly of the French Fifth Republic
Deputies of the 4th National Assembly of the French Fifth Republic
French Roman Catholics
University of Paris alumni
World War II political leaders
French people of the Algerian War